Robert Weinberg may refer to:
 Robert Weinberg (urban planner) (1902–1974)
 Robert Weinberg (biologist) (born 1942)
 Robert Weinberg (author) (1946–2016)